(Ye houses of heaven, ye radiant lights), BWV 193.1 (formerly BWV 193a), is a secular cantata by Johann Sebastian Bach first performed on 3 August 1727.

History and text 
This cantata was composed for the name day of Frederick August I, Elector of Saxony. The text is by Picander who published it in the second part of his collection Picanders Ernst-Schertzhaffte und Satyrische Gedichte (Leipzig 1729). However, there has been speculation that Picander based his text on the work of Christian Friedrich Hunold, an earlier librettist of Bach.  The reason for this suggestion is a similarity to a series of congratulatory cantatas Bach composed at Köthen.

The opening chorus is about a council of the gods. It was the custom for congratulatory works such as this to feature allegorical characters; in this case they are: Providentia (Providence), Fama (Fame), Salus (Well-being) and Pietas (Piety).
The title page bears the dedication: 

In English it may be rendered as: 

The cantata is counted among the works for celebrations of the Leipzig University, Festmusiken zu Leipziger Universitätsfeiern.

Structure 
The work has eleven movements:
 Chorus: 
 Recitative (Providentia): 
 Aria (Providentia): 
 Recitative (Fama): 
 Aria (Fama, Providentia): 
 Recitative (Providentia, Fama, Salus): 
 Aria (Salus): 
 Recitative (Pietas): 
 Aria (Pietas): 
 Recitative (Pietas): 
 Aria (Pietas, chorus): 

There has been speculation that the fifth movement, a duet (not found in Cantata BWV 193) between Providentia and Fama, may have influenced the duet "Domine Deus", the central movement of the Gloria in Bach's Mass in B Minor.

References

Sources 
 Cantata BWV 193a Ihr Häuser des Himmels, ihr scheinenden Lichter history, scoring, sources for text and music, translations to various languages, discography, discussion, Bach Cantatas Website
 Ihr Häuser des Himmels, ihr scheinenden Lichter history, scoring, Bach website 

Secular cantatas by Johann Sebastian Bach
Lost musical works by Johann Sebastian Bach
1727 compositions